Jean-Baptiste Louis Frédéric de La Rochefoucauld de Roye (August 17, 1707 – September 16, 1746) was made the Duc d'Anville by King Louis XV of France and pursued a military career in the French galley corps. He is best known for leading the French fleet on the disastrous Duc d'Anville Expedition to Acadia.

Biography
D'Anville was born on 17 August 1709, the son of Louis de La Rochefoucauld, Marquis de Roye, a distant cousin of the Dukes of La Rochefoucauld and Marthe Ducasse. He married Marie-Louise-Nicole de La Rochefoucauld, daughter of Alexandre, Duke de La Rochefoucauld. Alexandre had no surviving sons and exceptionally gained the permission of the Pope and the French King to hand the ducal title through the female line, but one of the conditions was that his daughter must marry a La Rochefoucauld. Jean-Baptiste de La Rochfoucauld de Roye was created Duc D'Anville on 15 February 1732, a few days before the marriage.

D'Anville and Marie-Louise-Nicole had three daughters and one son, Louis Alexandre, who succeeded to the title Duc D'Anville in 1746 on his father's death. And on his grandfather's death in 1762, he became Duc de La Rochefoucauld.

Duc d'Anville Expedition 

Although he had been appointed lieutenant general of the French navy in January 1745, the duc d'Anville did not have the proper naval training necessary to command the French fleet, which was to take part in the grand expedition the following year.

In 1746, the grand expedition was organized in France under the command of the duc d'Anville.
The expedition was composed 20 warships, 21 frigates, and 32 transport ships, containing 800 cannons, 3,000 soldiers, and 10,000 marines. The expedition was to retake Louisbourg and then Port Royal, then known as Annapolis Royal.

The crossing was very difficult, and it lasted 86 days.  Without enough supplies, hundreds of soldiers and sailors died of scurvy and other epidemics.  The French fleet was dispersed by a storm between Sable Island off Nova Scotia to as far away as the Caribbean. Some ships returned to France.

Less than half of the total expedition of the duc d'Anville managed to reach Chibouctou Bay.  After their arrival, the Acadiens helped take care of the soldiers. However, 1,200 men died during the crossing, and more than 1,000 died of typhoid after their arrival at Chibouctou.

The duc d'Anville was not spared, and died of a terrible epidemic, on 27 September 1746.  He was buried on Georges' Island, in the Chibouctou Bay, (in front of Halifax).  Two days later, vice-admiral d'Estournelles, who was second in command, committed suicide because of high fever.  The corpse of the duc d'Anville was transported to Louisbourg in 1748.

References 

1707 births
1746 deaths
New France
Acadian history
French Navy admirals